All the Ships at Sea is a 2004 American independent drama film directed by Dan Sallitt.

Synopsis
A professor of theology, named Evelyn (Strawn Bovee), and her sister Virginia (Edith Meeks), reunite to discuss their past experiences and what having religious beliefs means to them.

Cast

Reception
In a positive review for Variety, Scott Foundas said, "To encounter characters this authentically self-aware and introspective in an American film is rare, and pic heightens the effect by keeping the camera motionless and shooting in uncluttered, tableau-like close-ups and two-shots, putting Evelyn and Virginia front and center almost the entire time."

In a retrospective of Sallitt's films, Dana Stevens of Slate wrote about All the Ships at Sea, saying, "The encounter of these two women makes for a philosophically rich, emotionally naked chamber piece that’s reminiscent of Bergman films like Persona or Through the Glass Darkly."

References

External links
 

2004 films
2000s English-language films
2004 drama films